Leonard Hubert Bessell (6 February 1917 – 13 July 1981) was an Australian politician.

He was born in Whitemore, Tasmania. In 1956 he was elected to the Tasmanian House of Assembly as a Liberal member for Wilmot. He was Opposition Whip from 1966 to 1969 and a government minister from 1969 to 1972. He served until his defeat in 1976. Bessell died in Exeter.

References

1917 births
1981 deaths
Liberal Party of Australia members of the Parliament of Tasmania
Members of the Tasmanian House of Assembly
20th-century Australian politicians